Chandipura vesiculovirus (CHPV) is a member of the Rhabdoviridae family that is associated with an encephalitic illness in humans. It was first identified in 1965 after isolation from the blood of two patients from Chandipura village in Maharashtra state, India and has been associated with a number of otherwise unexplained outbreaks of encephalitic illness in central India. The most recent occurred in Andhra Pradesh and Maharashtra in June–August 2003 with 329 children affected and 183 deaths.
Further sporadic cases and deaths in children were observed in Gujarat state in 2004.

Chandipura vesiculovirus has been isolated from sandflies in India and West Africa  and is probably spread through its bite. The presence of the virus in Africa indicates a wide distribution although no human cases have been observed outside India.

The significance of Chandipura vesiculovirus as a human pathogen is unresolved due to doubts over its role in the 2003 and 2004 outbreaks.


Virology
Chandipura vesiculovirus is an enveloped RNA virus with an approximate genome length of ~11 kb. Viral genome codes for five polypeptides, namely, nucleocapsid protein N, phosphoprotein P, matrix protein M, glycoprotein G and large protein L in five monocistronic mRNAs. N protein encapsidates genome RNA into a nuclease-resistant form to protect in from cellular RNAse function. L and P protein together forms viral RNA dependent RNA polymerase; where catalytic functions for RNA polymerization, capping and poly-A polymerase resides within the L protein and P acts as a transcriptional activator. Matrix protein glues the encapsidated genome RNA, also known as nucleocapsid, with the outer membrane envelope. G protein spikes out of the membrane and acts as a major antigenic determinant.

Viral life cycle is cytosolic. During transcription, viral polymerase synthesizes five discrete mRNAs and obeys to stop signals that are present at the gene boundaries. Accumulation of adequate amounts of viral proteins within infected cells through viral transcription and subsequent translation potentiate the onset of viral replicative cycle. In this phase, same L protein acts as a replicase and ignore the gene junctions to generate a polycistronic anti-genomic analogue that acts as a template for further rounds of replication to generate many more copies of the genome RNA. This progeny genome RNA upon packaging by viral proteins bud out as mature virus particles. The precise mechanism underlying the switch in polymerase function during viral replication remains unknown.

Recent outbreaks
In 2003, 329 people died in outbreak in Andhra Pradesh and Maharashtra. In 2009, the virus infected 52 people and claimed 15 lives. In 2010, a total of 50 people contracted the virus and 16 died. A majority of the infected patients were below 14 years of age. Between 2009 and 2011, 110 tested positive, and 11 died in 2011.

An outbreak in Gujarat in Kheda District, Vadodara District, and Panchmahal District had killed 17 people in 2010. Sandfly bites are blamed as they inhabit cracks in walls or parts of homes made of sand or mud. The sporadic cases appeared in Gujarat in 2014 and 2016. One girl died in Ahmedabad in 2016. In 2019 one girl died in Bhayli village of Vadodara.

References

Viral diseases
Vesiculoviruses